Minuscule 411 (in the Gregory-Aland numbering), ε 1013 (in Soden's numbering), is a Greek minuscule manuscript of the New Testament, on parchment. Palaeographically it has been assigned to the 10th century. 
It has been marginalia.

Description 

The codex contains a complete text of the four Gospels on 375 parchment leaves. The text is written in one column per page, in 20 lines per page. It is very beautifully written in upright characters.

There is also a division according to the Ammonian Sections (in Mark 233 Sections, the last in 16:8), with references to the Eusebian Canons (written below Ammonian Section numbers).

The manuscript has survived in a good condition.

Text 

The Greek text of the codex is a representative of the Byzantine text-type. Hermann von Soden classified it to the textual family Kx. Aland placed it in Category V.
According to the Claremont Profile Method it represents textual family Kx in Luke 10 and Luke 20. In Luke 1 it has a mixture of the Byzantine families.

History 

The manuscript was written by Philip, a monk.

Wiedmann and J. G. J. Braun collated some portions of the manuscript for Scholz (1794-1852). The manuscript was added to the list of New Testament manuscripts by Scholz.
C. R. Gregory saw it in 1886.

The manuscript is currently housed at the Biblioteca Marciana (Gr. I. 18) in Venice.

See also 

 List of New Testament minuscules
 Biblical manuscript
 Textual criticism

References

Further reading 

 

Greek New Testament minuscules
10th-century biblical manuscripts